The 1987-88 FIBA Women's European Champions Cup was the 30th edition of FIBA Europe's competition for national champions women's basketball clubs, running from 23 September 1987 to 23 March 1988. Defending champion Primigi Vicenza defeated Dynamo Novosibirsk in a rematch of the previous edition's final to win its fourth title in a row, an overall fifth.

Qualifying round

Round of 12

Group stage

Final

References

Champions Cup
EuroLeague Women seasons